Mike Dodds (born 3 June 1986) is an English football coach, who was most recently interim manager at Sunderland.

Coaching career
At the age of 18, Dodds joined Coventry City as a youth coach, after acquiring his UEFA B License whilst still at college. In 2009, Dodds joined Birmingham City's academy in a coaching capacity. In 2020, Dodds made the step up to academy manager at Birmingham. During Dodds' time at Birmingham, he was credited with having a positive impact on the development of Birmingham academy graduates Nathan Redmond, Demarai Gray and Jude Bellingham.

In August 2021, Dodds left Birmingham to join Sunderland as head of individual player development. On 2 February 2022, Dodds was appointed interim manager of Sunderland, following the sacking of Lee Johnson.

Managerial statistics

References

1986 births
Living people
English football managers
Coventry City F.C. non-playing staff
Birmingham City F.C. non-playing staff
Sunderland A.F.C. non-playing staff
Sunderland A.F.C. managers
Association football coaches